A League of Their Own is a British television comedy panel game created by Paul Brassey which was hosted by actor and comedian James Corden for the first 13 series. Due to his commitments hosting The Late Late Show, Corden hosted only two episodes of series 14 with the remainder hosted by guests. Travel restrictions caused by the COVID-19 pandemic prevented Corden returning for series 15 as expected, the series was predominately hosted by regular panellist Romesh Ranganathan, with team captains Andrew "Freddie" Flintoff and Jamie Redknapp hosting one episode each. Ranganathan was confirmed as the new permanent host, starting from series 16. It premiered on Sky One on 11 March 2010 and remained on the channel until September 2021 when Sky One was closed and replaced with Sky Max where the show is now broadcast.

A regular episode of A League of Their Own sees two teams of three – Blue and Red – competing in a quiz about notable sports along with physical challenges; at the show's debut the captains of each team were been retired England cricketer Andrew "Freddie" Flintoff (Blue) and former Liverpool captain and England midfielder Jamie Redknapp (Red). For the first four series both teams had a regular panellist alongside the captain, journalist and presenter Georgie Thompson (Blue) and comedian John Bishop (Red). From series 5 until series 12, the Blue team had a regular panellist with comedian Jack Whitehall joining Flintoff. From series 13 to series 15, comedian Romesh Ranganathan was a regular panellist for the Red team alongside Redknapp, albeit with Ranganathan hosting most episodes in series 15. With Ranganathan's promotion to host from series 16, neither team had a regular panellist. Flintoff left the show following the Dingle to Dover road trip and has since been replaced by a guest captain each episode, retired footballer Micah Richards joined the Blue team as a regular panellist. Special episodes have also been produced where there is no quiz instead they feature compilations of clips either from recordings that have been broadcast in a series (labelled "The Best Bits from..."), material that was not broadcast (labelled "The Unseen Bits from...") or even from a particular challenge from an individual episode (labelled "The Best of...").

The first series consisted of twelve episodes. The second series consisted of thirteen episodes including a Christmas special. The third series had twelve episodes and saw the first occasion of a regular team captain being unable to attend an individual recording and being replaced by a guest, it also saw the introduction of splitting both "The Best Bits" and "The Unseen Bits" over two episodes therefore having four episodes of compilation clips; this technique was used on and off for future series. The fourth series consisted of ten episodes including an End of Year special. For the fifth series there were eleven episodes. The sixth series had ten episodes. The seventh series had twelve episodes including a compilation episode entitled "Rally Special" focussing solely on the rally car challenge from the series opener. The eighth series consisted of thirteen episodes. The ninth series had twelve episodes. The tenth series had ten episodes. As of 12 May 2022, 130 regular episodes and 51 compilations or specials have been broadcast across sixteen series, 181 episodes have been aired in total. There has also been six Road Trip spin off series, two in the US, two in Europe, one in the UK and one in the UK & Ireland. There have been 23 regular episodes and 12 compilations for a total of 35 Road Trip episodes.

Episode list

Key
  – Episodes with this background, and when the number on the left in the scores column is greater than the one on the right, were won by the Blue team (Flintoff with Thompson up to series four, Flintoff with Whitehall from series 5-12, Flintoff individually from series 13-16 and guest captains with Micah Richards from series 17)
  – Episodes with this background, and when the number on the right in the scores column is greater than the one on the left, were won by the Red team (Redknapp with Bishop up to series four, Redknapp individually from series 5-12, Redknapp with Ranganathan from series 13-14 and Redknapp individually from series 15)
  – Episodes with this background, and when the numbers on the left and right are equal, ended in a draw
 When a guest is listed in bold with a dagger symbol (†) it means they were team captain for that team in the episode as the regular captain was unable to make the recording or presented the show as guest host
 No. = The episode's order in the overall show

Series 1

Series 2

Series 3

Series 4

Series 5

Series 6

Series 7

Series 8

Series 9

Series 10

US Road Trip

Series 11

US Road Trip 2.0

A Premier League of Their Own

Series 12

Series 13

European Road Trip

Series 14

European Road Trip 2

Series 15

Road Trip: Loch Ness to London

Series 16

Road Trip: Dingle to Dover

Series 17

Scores

Notes

References

External links
 
 

Lists of British comedy television series episodes
Lists of British non-fiction television series episodes